Elections to Carrickfergus Borough Council were held on 30 May 1973 on the same day as the other Northern Irish local government elections. The election used three district electoral areas to elect a total of 15 councillors.

Election results

Districts summary

|- class="unsortable" align="centre"
!rowspan=2 align="left"|Ward
! % 
!Cllrs
! % 
!Cllrs
! %
!Cllrs
!rowspan=2|TotalCllrs
|- class="unsortable" align="center"
!colspan=2 bgcolor="" | UUP
!colspan=2 bgcolor="" | Alliance
!colspan=2 bgcolor="white"| Others
|-
|align="left"|Area A
|bgcolor="40BFF5"|39.8
|bgcolor="40BFF5"|2
|26.6
|1
|33.6
|2
|5
|-
|align="left"|Area B
|25.1
|2
|25.5
|1
|bgcolor="orange"|49.4
|bgcolor="orange"|2
|5
|-
|align="left"|Area C
|20.8
|1
|15.2
|1
|bgcolor="orange"|64.0
|bgcolor="orange"|3
|5
|-
|- class="unsortable" class="sortbottom" style="background:#C9C9C9"
|align="left"| Total
|28.3
|5
|22.3
|3
|49.4
|7
|15
|-
|}

Districts results

Area A

1973: 2 x UUP, 1 x United Loyalist, 1 x Alliance

Area B

1973: 2 x UUP, 1 x Alliance, 1 x United Loyalist, 1 x Independent

Area C

1973: 2 x United Loyalist, 1 x UUP, 1 x Alliance, 1 x Loyalist

References

Carrickfergus Borough Council elections
Carrickfergus